The Rural Municipality of Souris Valley No. 7 is a rural municipality (RM) in the Canadian province of Saskatchewan within Census Division No. 2 and  Division No. 1. Located in the southeast portion of the province, it is adjacent to the United States border, neighbouring Divide County in North Dakota.

History 
The RM of Souris Valley No. 7 incorporated as a rural municipality on December 13, 1909.

Geography

Communities and localities 
The following urban municipalities are surrounded by the RM.

Villages
Tribune

The following unincorporated communities are within the RM.

Localities
Bromhead
Hoffer
Oungre
Ratcliffe

Oungre Memorial Regional Park 

Oungre Park is a regional park in the RM that was founded in 1963 and has a campground, golf course, ball diamonds, disk golf, and a community centre. The park is located on the southern bank of Long Creek.

The original homesteader on the land, Frank Foster, had planted a grove of trees at the site in 1908. Even though the Fosters had left the area in 1926 after Frank's death, the site had become known as Foster's Grove and had become the location of annual sports days and picnics. In 1942, Foster's Grove was purchased by the RM. A bandstand was constructed in 1946 and a cenotaph was erected in 1947. In 1963, the park became Oungre Memorial Regional Park and further developments followed, such as the golf course in 1967, a swimming pool in 1969, the Souris Valley Communiplex in 1984, and an 18-hole mini golf course in 1985.

The Communiplex has an indoor swimming pool, arena, and restaurant. The golf course is a 9-hole, sand green course totalling 2,900 yards. The campground have 29 full service sites as well as electric and tenting sites. There are modern washrooms, laundry facilities, showers, and potable water.

Demographics 

Government 
The RM of Souris Valley No. 7 is governed by an elected municipal council and an appointed administrator that meets on the second Tuesday of every month. The reeve of the RM is Robert Forrester while its administrator is Erica Pederson. The RM's office is located in Oungre.

See also 
List of rural municipalities in Saskatchewan

References

External links 

Souris Valley
Division No. 2, Saskatchewan